Hashil Twaibu Abdallah is a Tanzanian academic Lecturer of Law and currently Deputy Permanent Secretary of Trade and Industry appointed by President Samia Suluhu Hassan in April 6, 2021. He was the Deputy Dean in the Faculty of Law and Head of Department of Criminal Law at the Open University of Tanzania for more than ten years.

Career
In 2003, he acquired Diploma in Law from the Institute of Judicial Administration, Bachelor of Law in 2007 from the Zanzibar University and Postgraduate diploma in Law in 2008 from the Law school of Tanzania. He obtained his Master's Degree in Intellectual property in 2010 and Doctor of Philosophy in Law (PhD) from Ruaha Catholic University. He is also an Advocate of the High court of Tanzania, member of Tanganyika Law Society and East Africa Law Society.

Selected works

See also

External link

References

Year of birth missing (living people)
Living people
Tanzanian educators
Tanzanian Muslims
Tanzanian civil servants
21st-century Tanzanian people
Open University of Tanzania alumni
Zanzibar University alumni
Ruaha University College alumni